American Party may refer to:

Political parties in the United States
The Toleration Party, also known as the American Party, was established in Connecticut to oppose the Federalist Party
The "Know Nothing" movement based on nativism used the partisan name "American Party" (1855–1856) and earlier or later in some cities and states
American Party (Utah), an anti-Mormon party that existed in Utah from 1905 to 1911
American Party (1909), established in 1909 to put the Iowa-based United Christian Party (United States) into new organizational form
American Party (1914), organized by ex-Governor of New York, William Sulzer
American Party (Texas), a one-man 1920 vehicle in Texas for James E. "Pa" Ferguson, which drew a plurality in some counties
American Party (1924), which ran Gilbert Nations for President of the United States and former congressman Charles H. Randall for vice-president in 1924, and which sought support from the Ku Klux Klan after its national convention
American Party (1969), a successor of the 1968 American Independent Party that had nominated Gov. George C. Wallace of Alabama
American Party of South Carolina
American Party (2010), a political party founded by computer engineer Roger E. Cowles in 2010 which holds the U.S. servicemark

See also
 "Party in the U.S.A.", a 2009 song by Miley Cyrus
 American Independent Party
 American Republican Party (1843)
 Independence Party of America
 Independent American Party of Nevada
 New American Independent Party